Receptor expression-enhancing protein 2 is a protein that in humans is encoded by the REEP2 gene.

Function 
The protein encoded by REEP2 belongs to a family of proteins with receptor enhancing expression capabilities, including possible enhancement of G protein-coupled receptors. The REEP2 protein shows a restricted mode of expression in human tissues.

Clinical significance 
REEP2 mutations have been reported in families with hereditary spastic paraplegia.

References

Further reading